The Van Gybland-Oosterhoff collection of the University of Pretoria in South Africa, collected by and donated by Louise Jeanette van Gybland Oosterhoff  (1885–1973) in honor of her brother Dr Horace Hugo Alexander van Gybland Oosterhoff (1887–1937). It was accepted by the university on 22 June 1937 and is the largest collection of objects, publications, memorabilia and photographs of historical interest, relating to Dutch culture outside of the Netherlands.

Engravings

See also
Mapungubwe Museum
Van Wouw Museum

References

University of Pretoria museums